The Birth of Alternative Vol. 2 is a compilation album released in 1998, from Rhino's Flashback Records imprint.

Track listing 
"About a Girl" by Nirvana (from Bleach)
"Sweet Young Thing Ain't Sweet No More" by Mudhoney (from Boiled Beef & Rotting Teeth)
"Between the Eyes" by Love Battery (from Between the Eyes)
"Down in the Dark" by Mark Lanegan (from The Winding Sheet)
"Change Has Come" by Screaming Trees (from Change Has Come)
"Retarded" by The Afghan Whigs (from Up in It)
"Go Your Own Way" by Seaweed (from Go Your Own Way EP and the Clerks soundtrack)
"3-D Witch Hunt" by Tad (from 8-Way Santa)
"Touch Me I'm Sick" by Mudhoney (from Boiled Beef & Rotting Teeth)
"Burn Black" by Hole (from the "Dicknail" single)

References

Grunge compilation albums
Alternative rock compilation albums
2003 compilation albums